Dale Glacier is a trenchlike glacier which drains the southwest slopes of Mount Huggins in the Royal Society Range and flows west into Skelton Glacier. First visited by F.R. Brooke and Bernard M. Gunn of the New Zealand party of the Commonwealth Trans-Antarctic Expedition, 1956–58, it was named by the Advisory Committee on Antarctic Names in 1963 for LCDR Robert L. Dale (USN), who was the officer in charge of the Squadron VX-6 detachment at McMurdo Station in 1960.

See also
 List of glaciers in the Antarctic
 Glaciology

References
 

Glaciers of Hillary Coast